The 2003 Family Circle Cup was a women's tennis tournament and the 31st edition of the Family Circle Cup. This WTA Tier I Event was held at the Family Circle Tennis Center in Charleston, South Carolina, United States and played on outdoor clay courts. Second-seeded Justine Henin-Hardenne won the singles title.

Finals

Singles

 Justine Henin-Hardenne defeated  Serena Williams 6–3, 6–4

Doubles

 Virginia Ruano Pascual /  Paola Suárez defeated  Janette Husárová /  Conchita Martínez 6–0, 6–3

External links
Tournament draws

Family Circle Cup
Charleston Open
Family Circle Cup
Family Circle Cup
Family Circle Cup